Roy Botham (19 April 1923 – 19 June 2007) was a British swimmer. He competed at the 1948 Summer Olympics and the 1952 Summer Olympics.

References

1923 births
2007 deaths
British male swimmers
Olympic swimmers of Great Britain
Swimmers at the 1948 Summer Olympics
Swimmers at the 1952 Summer Olympics
Sportspeople from Chesterfield, Derbyshire